Nordenskjöld Basin is an undersea basin named in association with the Nordenskjöld Ice Tongue (itself after explorer Otto Nordenskjöld). Name approved 4/80 (ACUF 201).

References

Oceanic basins of the Southern Ocean